Jarle Halsnes (born May 4, 1957) is a Norwegian alpine skier. He was born in Sauda, and represented the club Sauda IL. He competed at the 1980 Winter Olympics in Lake Placid.

References

External links
 

1957 births
Living people
People from Sauda
Norwegian male alpine skiers
Olympic alpine skiers of Norway
Alpine skiers at the 1980 Winter Olympics
Sportspeople from Rogaland